"Move Your Feet" is a song by Danish pop duo Junior Senior from their debut studio album, D-D-Don't Don't Stop the Beat (2002). The song, originally released in 2002 in the duo's native Denmark, was issued worldwide in 2003 and became Junior Senior's biggest hit, reaching  4 in Denmark, No. 3 in the United Kingdom, and No. 20 in Australia. A music video for the song, directed by British art collective Shynola, was created using low-resolution pixel art.

Chart performance
The song proved to be successful in the United Kingdom, where it peaked at number three on the UK Singles Chart for two non-consecutive weeks, going on to become Britain's 16th-best-selling single of 2003. It reached number four on the Danish Singles Chart and number 10 in Ireland. It was a moderate hit in Australia, peaking at number 20. In 2013, the song re-entered the French Singles Chart at number 11.

Music video
This song was accompanied by an animated music video by British art collective Shynola, using low-resolution (90×72) pixel art produced using Deluxe Paint. The video features animated characters of the members of Junior Senior, dancing figures, and personified inanimate objects.

Track listings

Danish CD single
 "Move Your Feet" (radio edit)
 "Coconuts" (movie edit)
 "Move Your Feet" (Djosos Krost Remix)
 "Move Your Feet" (extended play)

European CD single
 "Move Your Feet" (radio edit) – 2:59
 "Move Your Feet" (extended play) – 4:16

European maxi-CD single
 "Move Your Feet" (radio edit) – 2:59
 "Move Your Feet" (extended play) – 4:16
 "Move Your Feet" (Filur Move the Club) – 6:20
 "Move Your Feet" (Filur Dark String Dub) – 6:51
 "Move Your Feet" (video)

UK 12-inch single
A1. "Move Your Feet" (Kurtis Mantronik club mix) – 6:02
B1. "Move Your Feet" (Krafty Kuts Remix) – 6:14
B2. "Move Your Feet" (extended version) – 4:17

UK cassette single
 "Move Your Feet" – 2:59
 "Chicks and Dicks" – 2:32
 "Move Your Feet" (Kurtis Mantronik club mix) – 6:02

Australian CD single
 "Move Your Feet" (radio edit) – 3:01
 "Move Your Feet" (extended play) – 4:16
 "Move Your Feet" (Kurtis Mantronik club mix) – 6:04
 "Coconuts" (movie edit) – 2:39

Credits and personnel
Credits are lifted from the D-D-Don't Don't Stop the Beat liner notes.

Studios
 Recorded at Delta Lab (Copenhagen, Denmark)
 Additional mix and recording at Tambourine Studios (Malmö, Sweden)
 Mastered at Tocano (Copenhagen, Denmark)

Personnel

 Junior – writing, guitar, production, additional mix and recording (Delta Lab)
 Senior – handclaps
 Thomas Troelsen – vocals, backing vocals, bass, keys, drums, production, mixing, engineering
 Anna Køster – backing vocals
 Yebo – backing vocals
 Lars Vognstrup – backing vocals
 Signe-Marie Jacobsen – backing vocals
 Sara Wölck – backing vocals
 Jesper Reginal – mixing, additional engineering
 Per Sunding – additional mix and recording (Tambourine)
 The Great Nalna – editing
 Morten Bue – mastering

Charts and certifications

Weekly charts

Year-end charts

Certifications

Release history

References

2002 debut singles
2002 songs
Animated music videos
Dance-punk songs
Epic Records singles
Junior Senior songs
Mercury Records singles
Songs about dancing